Stephen Perse (1548 – 30 September 1615) was an English academic and philanthropist, who founded schools that still carry his name.

Biography
He was probably educated at Norwich School, and took his B.A. degree at Gonville and Caius College, Cambridge in 1569, where he was elected to a fellowship. Ordained in May 1573, as an Anglican priest and deacon, he was subsequently permitted to change his fellowship to "physick" and took the degree of Doctor of Medicine in 1581.

Perse amassed a fortune of around £10,000, probably from profits on business loans. He gave money to the University library, for the establishment of the road now known as Maid’s Causeway, and for the public water supply from the springs at Nine Wells to Cambridge along the stream now known as Hobson’s Conduit.

The grave of Stephen Perse is commemorated by a memorial in the college chapel and he is remembered at the College's annual Perse Feast. His epitaph there reads:

Educational foundation
In his will, Perse gave a significant sum of money for the establishment of "a Grammar Free Schoole", and adjoining almhouses for six poor widows.  The school was to teach five score scholars born in Cambridge, Barnwell, Chesterton or Trumpington, with some of the boys able to proceed to scholarships at Gonville & Caius College.

The Perse School was founded in 1615 at its original site in Free School Lane, Cambridge.  His foundation is commemorated by a blue plaque on the site. In 1881, the Perse School for Girls was established, now part of the Stephen Perse Foundation.

References

1548 births
1615 deaths
People educated at Norwich School
Fellows of Gonville and Caius College, Cambridge
Founders of English schools and colleges
Alumni of Gonville and Caius College, Cambridge
16th-century English writers
16th-century male writers
17th-century English writers
17th-century English male writers
English philanthropists